The Early Bedroom Sessions is a second compilation album of electronic music that was recorded by Swedish musician Basshunter. The album is composed of 23 tracks in Swedish and English taken from his earlier releases. It was first released digitally on the Rush Hour label from 3 December 2012 and was later released as a double CD album on Ultra Records on 29 January 2013.

Release and reception

Basshunter's previous compilation album The Old Shit was released in 2006. On 27 October 2012 Basshunter announced he would release old material  he recorded before he signed to a record label. In November Basshunter announced his tracks would be released in the United States that month. The compilation was released digitally on 3 December by Rush Hour and on 23 January 2013 Ultra Records released the album as a double CD package.

The album contains 23 tracks in Swedish and English and has a running time of 112 minutes and 56 seconds. "Bass Worker" is the opening track and "Wizard Elements" is the closing track. The longest song on the album is "Syndrome de Abstenencia", which runs for six minutes and 35 seconds. "The Bass Machine" is the shortest track, lasting two minutes and 24 seconds. Ten of the album's songs were originally released on previous studio album The Bassmachine (2004); seven songs are from The Old Shit (2006), one song "Go Down Now" was released on the single "Angel in the Night" (2008), "Trance Up" is from promotional single "Syndrome de Abstenencia" (2004), and the promotional single "Wacco Will Kick Your Ass" (2005). The tracks "Rainbow Stars", "Try to Stop Us" and "Wizard Elements" had not been released previously. Track "Counterstrike the Mp3" was dedicated to his Counter-Strike clan. "Wacco Will Kick Your Ass" is also dedicated for his Counter-Strike clan Waccos.

David Jeffries from AllMusic, who also reviewed Basshunter's album Bass Generation, said The Early Bedroom Sessions is dedicated to loyal fans because the tracks it includes are barely connected stylistically and because of problems with the availability of The Bassmachine and The Old Shit. Release of album was also covered by Swedish newspaper Hallandsposten.

Track listing

Release history

References

External links 
 

2012 compilation albums
Electronic albums by Swedish artists
Swedish-language compilation albums
Ultra Records albums
Basshunter albums